John Monckton may refer to:
 John Monckton (town clerk), British civil servant, Town Clerk of London
 John Monckton (financier), British financier who was murdered in 2004
 John Monckton (swimmer) (1938–2017), Australian Olympic silver medallist backstroke swimmer